No gods, no masters is an anarchist and labor rights slogan.

No gods, no masters may also refer to:

 No Gods No Masters: An Anthology of Anarchism, a book by Daniel Guérin
  No Gods No Masters (Criminal album), 2004
 No Gods No Masters (Garbage album), 2021
 "No Gods No Masters" (song), 2021 single by Garbage
 No God, No Master, a 2012 American crime film